Steptacular is the second studio album by British pop group Steps, released in the United Kingdom on 25 October 1999, through Jive Records. The album was accompanied by five singles; "Love's Got a Hold on My Heart", "After the Love Has Gone", "Say You'll Be Mine", "Deeper Shade of Blue" and "When I Said Goodbye" all hit the UK top 5, making Steptacular the first Steps album to contain fix consecutive UK top-five hits. 

Steptacular debuted at number one on the UK Albums Chart, and it remained on the position for three weeks, selling 260,000 copies in the same time frame.

Background and release
Like the group's debut album, Steptacular also contains covers, including a song originally released by female pop group Bananarama entitled "Movin' On", "Make It Easy on Me" originally recorded by Sybil and "Deeper Shade of Blue" originally recorded by Tina Cousins. The album also includes the group's version of "Tragedy", which was originally recorded for the Bee Gees tribute album Gotta Get a Message to You, which was released shortly after Step One. Early UK copies of the album featured a holographic silver "STEPS" logo on front. It was also released in cardboard and tin boxed sets, internationally.

Commercial performance
On 31 October 1999, the album debuted at number one in the United Kingdom and remained for three consecutive weeks. The album sold 84,000 units in its first week—only 1,000 copies ahead of Westlife's debut album, Westlife, beating the Irish boy band.

Track listing

  
  

Notes
Steptacular was released in Australia with a revised track listing, including two bonus tracks.
Steptacular was released in Hong Kong, Malaysia and Taiwan in a boxed set limited edition, containing the UK track list of the album and the CD single for "After the Love Has Gone".

Personnel

Producers
Topham, Twigg and Waterman (for tracks 1, 3, 5, 7, 10, 11 and 13)
Frampton and Waterman (for tracks 2, 4, 9 and 12)
Work in Progress (W.I.P) (for tracks 6 and 8)
Sanders and Waterman (for track 14)
Engineers
Chris McDonnell (for tracks 1, 3, 5, 10 and 11)
McDonnell and Tim "Spag" Speight (for tracks 7 and 13)
Dan Frampton (for tracks 2, 4, 9 and 12)
Paul Waterman (for tracks 6 and 8)
Speight and Al Unsworth (for track 14)

Mixing
Tim "Spag" Speight (for tracks 1, 5 and 7)
Dan Frampton and Paul Waterman (for track 3)
Frampton (for tracks 2, 4, 9, 12 and 14)
Waterman (for tracks 6 and 8)
Chris McDonnell (for tracks 10, 11 and 13)
Backing vocals: Mary Carewe, Mae McKenna, Andrew Frampton, Lance Ellington, Bernadette Barlow
Assistant engineers: Al Unsworth and Roe Waterman
Photography: Mike Owen
Mastered by Richard Dowling at Transfermation
All tracks were recorded and mixed at PWL studios in London and Manchester.

Charts and certifications

Weekly charts

Year-end charts

Certifications

Release history

References

 

1999 albums
Steps (group) albums
Jive Records albums